Asketanthera is a genus of plants in the family Apocynaceae first described as a genus in 1878. It is native to  the West Indies.

Species
 Asketanthera calycosa (A.Rich.) Woodson - Cuba
 Asketanthera dolichopetala (Urb.) Woodson - Dominican Republic
 Asketanthera longiflora Woodson - Dominican Republic + Haiti
 Asketanthera obtusifolia Alain - Sierra del Bahoruco in Dominican Republic
 Asketanthera picardae (Urb.) Woodson - Haiti

Formerly included
Asketanthera steyermarkii Markgr., syn of Macropharynx steyermarkii (Markgr.) J.F.Morales

References

Apocynaceae genera
Echiteae